Dan Johansson (born 11 July 1950) is a Swedish speed skater. He competed in two events at the 1976 Winter Olympics.

References

External links
 

1950 births
Living people
Swedish male speed skaters
Olympic speed skaters of Sweden
Speed skaters at the 1976 Winter Olympics
People from Örnsköldsvik Municipality
Sportspeople from Västernorrland County
20th-century Swedish people